, also called Doll's Day or Girls' Day, is a religious (Shinto) holiday in Japan, celebrated on 3March of each year. Platforms covered with a red carpet–material are used to display a set of  representing the Emperor, Empress, attendants, and musicians in traditional court dress of the Heian period.

Customs 
 is one of the  that are held on auspicious dates of the Chinese calendar: the first day of the first month, the third day of the third month, and so on. After the adoption of the Gregorian calendar, these were fixed on 1January, 3March, 5May, 7July, and 9September. Although this is no longer true since the shift to Gregorian dates, the name remains and peaches are still symbolic of the festival.

The dolls are usually seated on red cloth, and may be as simple as pictures or folded paper dolls, or as intricate as carved three-dimensional dolls. More elaborate displays will include a multi-tiered  of dolls that represent ladies of the court, musicians, and other attendants, with all sorts of accoutrements. The number of tiers and dolls a family may have depends on their budget.

Families normally ensure that girls have a set of the two main dolls before their first Hinamatsuri. The dolls are usually fairly expensive ($1,500 to $2,500 for a five-tier set, depending on quality) and may be handed down from older generations as heirlooms. The  spends most of the year in storage, and girls and their mothers begin setting up the display a few days before 3March (boys normally do not participate, as 5May, now Children's Day, was historically called "Boys' Day"). Traditionally, the dolls were supposed to be put away by the day after , the superstition being that leaving the dolls any longer will result in a late marriage for the daughter, but some families may leave them up for the entire month of March. Practically speaking, the encouragement to put everything away quickly is to avoid the rainy season and humidity that typically follows .

Historically, the dolls were used as toys, but in modern times they are intended for display only. The display of dolls is usually discontinued when the girls reach ten years old.

During  and the preceding days, girls hold parties with their friends.

 ceremonies are held around the country, where participants make dolls out of paper or straw and send them on a boat down a river, carrying one's impurities and sin with them. Some locations, such as at the Nagashibina Doll Museum in Tottori City, still follow the lunisolar calendar instead of doing it on 3March.

, traditional decoration for Hinamatsuri, are lengths of coloured cords (usually in red), usually featuring decorations of miniature baby-dolls, which were originally made from leftover kimono silk (so the idea of repurposing fabric scraps is central to this craft; it is a great activity for using up leftover materials). Tsurushi-Bina are not limited to featuring miniature baby-dolls, but also flowers (i.e., camellia flower, etc.), shells, Temari balls, colourful triangles to represent mountains (such as Mount Fuji, etc.), etc., and with tassels at the bottom.

Placement
The actual placement order of the dolls from left to right varies according to family tradition and location, but the order of dolls per level is the same. The layer of covering is called  or simply , a red carpet with rainbow stripes at the bottom. The description that follows is for a complete set.

First, top platform
The words dairi means "imperial palace". Although they are sometimes referred to as the Emperor and Empress, they only represent the positions and not the actual individuals themselves (with the exception of some dolls from the Meiji period that actually depict Emperor Meiji and Empress Shōken). The two are usually placed in front of a gold folding screen  and placed beside green Japanese garden trees.

Generally speaking, the Kansai style arrangement has the male on the right, while Kantō style arrangements have him on the left (from the viewer's perspective).

Second platform
The second tier holds three court ladies  who serve sake to the male and female dolls. The , placed in the middle, holds a small table and maybe standing or sitting/kneeling.

Third platform
The third tier holds five male musicians . Each holds a musical instrument except the singer, who holds a fan:
 , seated,
 , standing,
 , standing,

There are ancient sets with seven or ten musicians and at least one with female musicians.

Fourth platform
Two  may be displayed on the fourth tier. Both are sometimes equipped with bows and arrows. When representing the ministers, the Minister of the Right is depicted as a young person, while the Minister of the Left is older because that position was the more senior of the two. Also, because the dolls are placed in positions relative to each other, the Minister of the Right will be on "stage right" (the viewer's left) and the Minister of the Left will be on the other side.

Fifth platform
 Crying drinker ,
 Angry drinker , and
 Laughing drinker

Other platforms
On the sixth and seventh tiers, various miniature furniture, tools, carriages, etc., are displayed.

Sixth platform
These are items used within the palatial residence.
  : chest of (usually five) drawers, sometimes with swinging outer covering doors.
  : long chest for kimono storage.
  : smaller clothing storage box, placed on top of nagamochi.
  : literally mirror stand, a smaller chest of drawers with a mirror on top.
  : sewing kit box.
 two  : braziers.

Seventh, bottom platform
These are items used when away from the palatial residence.

 , a set of nested lacquered food boxes with either a cord tied vertically around the boxes or a stiff handle that locks them together.
 , a palanquin.
 , an ox-drawn carriage favored by Heian nobility.
 Less common, an ox drawing a cart of flowers.

Origin 

It is said that the first time Hina dolls were shown in the manner they are now as part of the Peach Festival was when the young princess Meisho succeeded to the throne of her abdicating father, Emperor Go-Mizunoo, in 1629. Because female emperors in Japan at the time were not allowed to get married, Meisho's mother, Tokugawa Masako, created a doll arrangement showing Meisho blissfully wedded. Hinamatsuri then officially became the name of the festival in 1687. Over time, the hinazakari evolved to include fifteen dolls and accessories. As dolls became more expensive, tiers were added to the hinadan so that the expensive ones could be placed out of the reach of young children.

During the Meiji period as Japan began to modernize and the emperor was restored to power, Hinamatsuri was deprecated in favor of new holidays that focused on the emperor's supposed to bond with the nation, but it was revived. By focusing on marriage and families, it represented Japanese hopes and values. The dolls were said to represent the emperor and empress; they also fostered respect for the throne. The holiday then spread to other countries via the Japanese diaspora, although it remains confined to Japanese immigrant communities and descendants.

See also 

 Golu – a similar tradition in India
 Hōko (doll) – A talisman doll, given to young women of age and especially to pregnant women in Japan to protect both mother and unborn child.
 International Day of the Girl Child
 International Women's Day
 Japanese festivals
 Japanese dolls
 Japanese traditional dolls
 Karakuri puppet – Japanese clockwork automata.
 Public holidays in Japan
 Tango no Sekku
 Yurihonjo hinakaido – an annual trail of hina doll displays in Yurihonjo City

References

Further reading 
 Ishii, Minako　(2007). Girls' Day/Boys' Day. Honolulu: Bess Press Inc. . A children's picture book.
 Murguia, Salvador Jimenez (2011). "Hinamatsuri and the Japanese Female: A Critical Interpretation of the Japanese Doll Festival". Journal of Asia Pacific Studies 2.2: 231–247
 Pate, Alan Scott (2013). Ningyo: The Art of the Japanese Doll. Tuttle Publishing.

External links

 Hinamatsuri (Doll's Festival)
 Hinamatsuri in Sado, Niigata, Japan (Doll's Festival)
 Video on Hinamatsuri  (Hinamatsuri Girls' Day | Doll's Festival)

Festivals in Japan
Japanese dolls
March observances
Shinto festivals
Articles containing video clips